Mediastinal fibrosis  most common cause is idiopathic mediastinal fibrosis; less commonly histoplasmosis tuberculosis or unknown. It is characterized by invasive, calcified fibrosis centered on lymph nodes that block major vessels and airways. In Europe, this disease is exceptionally rare. More cases are seen in USA where the disease may often be associated with histoplasmosis.

See also
 Mediastinitis

References

External links 

 

Respiratory diseases
Lymphatic organ diseases